Chico River may refer to:

In Argentina:
 Chico River (Gallegos)
 Chico River (Lower Chubut)
 Chico River (Patagonia)
 Chico River (Santa Cruz)
 Chico River (Upper Chubut)

Elsewhere:
 Chico River (Sucre), Bolivia
 Chico River (Panama)
 Chico River (Philippines)
 Chico River (Puerto Rico)

See also 
 Río Chico (disambiguation)
 Arapey Chico River
 Ibirapuitã Chico River
 Olimar Chico River
 Queguay Chico River
 Sauce Chico River
 Chico Creek, Colorado